John Dougall (21 September 1810 – 5 April 1888) was a merchant and the founder of the Montreal Witness.

Biography

He was born in Paisley, Scotland and was raised in the cloth trade there. John emigrated to Canada in 1826 and was followed by his brother.

He and his brother James Dougall began by the selling of dry goods, first in Quebec, and later moving the business to Montreal and York, in the Toronto region.  They were later joined by their father in 1828.

In 1845, he founded the Montreal Witness (1845–1938), hostile to Catholics. For example, John Dougall persisted in accusing the mayor of Montreal, Charles Wilson, for the Gavazzi Riots.

In 1871, Dougall also founded the New York Daily Witness, which had failed by 1878, but his companion New York Weekly Witness survived, and was later run by Dougall's son James, publishing until 1920.

Notes

External links 
 Biography at the Dictionary of Canadian Biography Online
 
 

1808 births
1886 deaths
19th-century Canadian businesspeople
Canadian merchants
People from Paisley, Renfrewshire
Scottish emigrants to pre-Confederation Quebec
Immigrants to Lower Canada
Anglophone Quebec people